Kathleen Lumley College was a co-residential college located in Lower North Adelaide, South Australia, and affiliated with the University of Adelaide. It provided accommodation for postgraduate students from any of the institutions of higher learning in South Australia, as well as visiting academics and visitors to the State's cultural and research institutions. It closed in January 2022, as a result of the impact of the COVID-19 pandemic on the higher education sector.

Facilities and History

The college had guest rooms with ensuite, sets (bedroom and study), as well as a number of two-room flats. The College was located a 15-minute walk from Adelaide's city centre, with a number of University playing fields outside its gates and within easy walking distance of shopping and dining spots. Each room was fully furnished, and the college provided a linen service for visitors. There were common entertainment, kitchen and laundry facilities (free-of-charge for residents and visitors). Breakfast and dinner were provided 6 days each week. Mondays through Thursdays, the menu was à la carte, with a wide range of dishes (including vegetarian fare). Formal dinners were held a number of times a year, and these were included in the residential costs, if the resident is on a six-month (24-week) or year-long (48-week) contract.

The college was founded in 1968 with funds donated by Kathleen Lumley. The RAIA Award-winning main building was designed in conjunction with the Union Building at the University of Adelaide by Neil Platten and Robert Dickson. The College was popular with international students, many of whom have gone on to prominent careers in teaching, diplomacy, public service and the private sector in their home countries. Country and interstate students were another prominent group in the College's community. Kathleen Lumley College has a number of elected Honorary and Research Fellows, as well as Research Associates, as part of its life. There were a limited number of Scholarships, Bursaries and other forms of financial support that long-term members of the College can apply for. The most recent of these has been the Cowan Grant Bursary, which emphasises support for students from the country.

College Masters

See also
 South Australian Association of University College Clubs

References
 

3. Lumley, Mrs Kathleen ‘A Rainbow Life’, 1970, privately published in hardback, printed by Molyneux Ltd. Mrs Lumley’s account of her role in financing and opening the college are found at pp. 117-119.

External links
 Kathleen Lumley College - Website

Residential colleges of the University of Adelaide